Lisa Maria Fernandez (born February 22, 1971) is an American former softball player and current associate head coach at UCLA. She played college softball at UCLA as a pitcher and third baseman, and is a three-time medal winning Olympian with Team USA.

Fernandez starred on both sides of the plate for the UCLA Bruins from 1990 to 1993, and was two-time national champion and four-time first team All-American. She continues to hold the UCLA records for career shutouts, WHIP and winning percentage. She also established an Olympic record in softball with 25 strikeouts in a game as a member of the United States women's national softball team. Additionally, she is noted for having pitched in three consecutive gold medal games, getting a save in 1996, an extra-inning shutout in 2000 before concluding the run by cinching the 2004 medal in a 5–1 victory. Fernandez was named the #1 Greatest College Softball Player and is a USA Softball Hall of Fame honoree.

Early years
Fernandez was born and raised in Long Beach, California. Her father emigrated from Cuba, where he played baseball, and her mother was of Puerto Rican descent. Fernandez's mother played, with her brother (Lisa's uncle) stickball, a street game similar to baseball played with a broom stick and a rubber ball. Fernandez began playing softball at the age of eight. When she was twelve, she played in a local children's league. She tried out as a pitcher, however, her coach told her that she would never make it because she didn't have the right size and build. At St. Joseph High School, Fernandez joined her school's girls' softball team and together with her teammates won the CIF Championship.

College career
Upon graduating from high school, she was accepted to UCLA, where she played softball and earned a degree in psychology. Fernandez played at UCLA from 1990 to 1993. She was a three-time winner of the Pac-12 Player of the Year award, and four-time winner of the Honda Sports Award for softball, and became the first softball player to win the Honda-Broderick Cup in 1993, given to the outstanding collegiate female athlete in all sports. A four-time, first-team All-American, Fernandez led UCLA to two national championships (1990 & 1992) and two runner-up finishes (1991 & 1993).

U.S. Women's Olympic Softball Team
In 1990, Fernandez won a gold medal at the ISF (International Softball Federation) World Championship. Among her accomplishments are:

 1991, gold medal at the Pan American Games
 1994, gold medals at ISF World Championships and Pan Am Qualifier
 1991 and 1992, Sportswoman of the Year Award
 Led UCLA to two NCAA Women's College World Series Titles
 Four-time NFCA First Team All-American
 NCAA Top VI Award presented to the top six senior student athletes in all divisions
 1993, Honda-Broderick Cup winner, country's most outstanding collegiate female athlete
 1991-93, Four-time Honda Sports Award winner for softball presented to the nation's best softball player
 1996, Olympic gold medal in the 1996 Olympics celebrated in Atlanta, Georgia
 1998, gold medal at Pan American Games;
 2000, Olympic gold medal in the 2000 Sydney Olympics celebrated in Australia where she established a 25 strikeout record in women's softball
 2002, gold medal at the ISF World Championships
 2003, gold medal at the Pan American Games
 2004, Olympic gold medal in the 2004 Athens Olympics celebrated in Greece.

Honors

On April 24, 2001, the Lakewood City Council recognized Fernandez as one of the most remarkable athletes ever to come from the playgrounds and ball diamonds of Lakewood. The city council named the ball field at Mayfair Park in her honor, as the Lakewood Sports Hall of Fame Athlete of the Year.

Fernandez was inducted into the Baseball Reliquary's Shrine of the Eternals in 2019.

Later years
She married Michael Lujan in 2002 and gave birth to their sons Antonio in 2005, and Cruz in 2008. Fernandez and her family reside in Long Beach, California. Fernandez is currently an assistant coach for the women's softball team at UCLA. In 2017, she was suspended two games for bumping an umpire after being ejected from a Bruins' Women's College World Series game. On August 10, 2022, Fernandez was promoted to associate head coach for the Bruins.

Statistics

See also

 List of people of Puerto Rican descent in Sports
 Sports in Puerto Rico
 Lakewood, California
 List of people from Long Beach, California

References

External links
 
 
 
 
 

1971 births
Living people
Puerto Rican softball players
Softball players from California
Olympic softball players of the United States
Softball players at the 1996 Summer Olympics
Softball players at the 2000 Summer Olympics
Softball players at the 2004 Summer Olympics
Olympic gold medalists for the United States in softball
UCLA Bruins softball players
People from Lakewood, California
Medalists at the 2008 Summer Olympics
Medalists at the 2004 Summer Olympics
Medalists at the 2000 Summer Olympics
Medalists at the 1996 Summer Olympics
Olympic silver medalists for the United States in softball
Sportspeople from Long Beach, California
UCLA Bruins softball coaches
Softball coaches from California